The 2014 Kvalserien was the 40th and final Kvalserien, consisting of two Swedish Hockey League teams and four HockeyAllsvenskan teams. It began on 17 March 2014 and will end on 7 April 2014. The 2014 Kvalserien determined which two teams of the participating ones would play in the 2014–15 SHL season and which four teams would play in the 2014–15 HockeyAllsvenskan season. Örebro HK defended their SHL spot and Djurgårdens IF returned to the top-tier league after a two-year stint in HockeyAllsvenskan. AIK were relegated to HockeyAllsvenskan.

Participating teams

From SHL (ranked 11–12)
Örebro HK
AIK

From HockeyAllsvenskan (ranked 1–3) 
Malmö Redhawks
VIK Västerås HK
Djurgårdens IF

From HockeyAllsvenskan playoff round
Rögle BK

Standings

Statistics

Scoring leaders 
 
Updated as of the end of the 2014 Kvalserien.
GP = Games played; G = Goals; A = Assists; Pts = Points; +/– = Plus/minus; PIM = Penalty minutes

Leading goaltenders 
These are the leaders in GAA among goaltenders who have played at least 40% of the team's minutes. Updated as of the end of the 2014 Kvalserien.

GP = Games played; TOI = Time on ice (minutes); GA = Goals against; SO = Shutouts; Sv% = Save percentage; GAA = Goals against average

References

External links 
Official statistics for ice hockey in Sweden

Kvalserien
2014